Lamont Marcell Jacobs Jr. (born 26 September 1994) is an Italian track and field sprinter and former long jumper. He is the 2020 Olympic 100 metres champion, the 2022 60 metres world champion, the 2022 European 100 metres champion, and a member of the gold medal-winning  relay team at the 2020 Olympics. He currently holds the 100 metres European record, the 60 metres European record, and is the first Italian to ever qualify for and win the men's 100 metres Olympic final.

Biography

Early life
Jacobs is the son of Viviana Masini, an Italian woman, and Lamont Marcell Jacobs Sr., an African American serviceman. His parents met when his father was a United States Army soldier serving at Caserma Ederle in Vicenza, Italy. His father was 18 and his mother was 16 at the time.

His parents married and relocated to Fort Bliss in El Paso, Texas. Three years later, Jacobs was born. When he was three weeks old, his father was transferred to South Korea, and Jacobs moved to Desenzano del Garda, in Lombardy, Italy, with his mother. His parents split when he was six months old.

He started out playing basketball and football, where his football coach, Adriano Bertazzi, took notice of his speed and suggested that Jacobs try sprinting.

When Jacobs was ten, he began competing in athletics. He preferred sprinting until he discovered the long jump in 2011.

Personal life
Jacobs lives in Rome with his wife, Nicole Daza, and their two children.  Jacobs has another son, born from a previous relationship when Jacobs was nineteen.

Although Jacobs was born in the United States, he strictly identifies as being Italian.

Jacobs had been estranged from his father since he was an infant; however, in 2020, he reestablished a relationship with him at the suggestion of his mental coach. He cited that reconciling with his father gave him the motivation and peace of mind he needed to focus on winning in the Olympics.

Career

Long jump
In 2016, Jacobs won the Italian Athletics Championships in long jump. With a personal best of 8.07 meters, he ranked tenth on the IAAF (now World Athletics) world-leading list at the end of the 2017 indoor season.

At the 2016 Italian U23 Championships, he jumped 8.48 meters, the best performance ever for an Italian, although this result was not recognized as a national record due to a 2.8 m/s tailwind, which was 0.8 m/s above the allowable maximum for any record performance.

Jacobs did not participate in the 2016 Summer Olympics due to a hamstring injury.

Sprinting
In 2019, Jacobs decided to focus his efforts exclusively on sprinting, citing frequent injuries while long jumping among the reasons for this switch.

In July 2019, Jacobs lowered his 100 metres personal best to 10.03 seconds, making him the third-fastest Italian in history.

On 6 March 2021, Jacobs won the 60 metres European title at the 2021 European Athletics Indoor Championships held in Toruń, Poland, setting a new national record and worldwide season-best with a time of 6.47 seconds.

On 13 May 2021, in Savona, Italy, Jacobs set the Italian record in the 100 metres with a time of 9.95 seconds, becoming the 150th person in history and the second Italian to break the 10-second barrier. On 26 June 2021, into a headwind of −1.0 m/s in Rovereto, he broke the Italian championship record with a time of 10.01 seconds, winning his fourth national title in a row.

2020 Olympics

Jacobs won his first 100 metres heat at the 2020 Tokyo Olympics in 9.94 seconds, improving his own Italian record by 0.01. In the semi-final, he was third with a time of 9.84 seconds, setting a new European record and qualifying for the final with the third overall fastest time. He is the first Italian to ever reach an Olympic 100m final.

In the final, Jacobs won the gold medal with a time of 9.80 seconds, beating Fred Kerley (9.84) and Andre De Grasse (9.89).  Jacobs is the first Italian to win the gold medal in the event, and the first European to win since Linford Christie won the event at the 1992 Olympics in Barcelona.

His effort broke the European record he set in the semi-final earlier that day, recording the fastest time ever run by an athlete that is neither American or Jamaican. Due to this performance, Jacobs is tied with Steve Mullings as the 10th fastest man of all time.   Jacobs was not favored to win the race, with bookmakers giving him a three percent chance of winning.

Jacobs later won a second gold medal in the 4×100 metres as part of the Italian relay team, along with Lorenzo Patta, Fausto Desalu and Filippo Tortu.  It was the first time Italy had ever won this event, and also the first time Italy had earned a medal in the event in 73 years. Jacobs ran the team's second leg (split time: 8.925), contributing to its total run time of 37.50 seconds, setting a new Italian record.

Due to his outstanding achievements, Jacobs was selected by the Italian Olympic Committee to be Italy's flag bearer during the Olympics closing ceremony.

Jacobs ended his season shortly after the Olympics, citing fatigue, and cancelling two upcoming Diamond League appearances.

After the Games, it was reported that Giacomo Spazzini, who had worked as Jacobs' nutritionist, was involved in a steroid investigation in Italy. In response, Jacobs' agent stated that the athlete had cut ties with Spazzini several months before the Olympics.

2021/2022 indoor season
Jacobs returned to competition in February 2022, winning the 60 m race at the ISTAF Indoor in Berlin with a time of 6.51. In subsequent races, which included winning the national 60 m indoor title, he lowered his season best to 6.49, arriving at the world indoor championships in Belgrade with the 5th fastest time in the season. In his semi-final he equalled the world leading time of 6.45, held by pre-championship favorite and world record holder Christian Coleman and Bahamian sprinter Terrence Jones, setting a new national record. In the final he edged Coleman by 3 thousands of a second setting a new European record of 6.41, winning the gold medal and becoming the 4th fastest man in history on such distance.

2022 outdoor season
Jacobs was supposed to start his outdoor season competing in the 100 metres at the 2022 Kip Keino Classic in Nairobi, Kenya, however he missed his debut after being hospitalised for a gastrointestinal infection. He officially opened his outdoor season with a time of 10.04, winning an international meet in Savona, after changing his original plan of competing in the 200 metres. Having sustained a slight injury to his biceps femoris, he took the decision to withdraw from three Diamond League meets which were on his calendar.

Having had to withdraw before the semi-finals of the 2022 World Championships due to a thigh injury, at the 2022 European Championships in Munich, Jacobs won the 100m final in a time of 9.95 seconds, beating reigning champion Zharnel Hughes into the second position (9.99s), with Jeremiah Azu completing the podium with a time of 10.13.

Statistics

European records
 100 metres: 9.80 (+0.1 m/s;  Tokyo, 1 August 2021). Current holder
 60 metres: 6.41 ( Belgrade, 19 March 2022). Current holder

National records
  relay: 37.50 ( Tokyo, 6 August 2021), he ran second leg in the team with Lorenzo Patta, Fausto Desalu, Filippo Tortu.

Progression
100 m

International competition

Other meetings

National competitions

 * Denotes senior level national champion.

National titles
Jacobs won nine national championships at individual senior level.
Italian Athletics Championships
100 m: 2018, 2019, 2020, 2021, 2022 (5)
Long jump: 2016 (1)
Italian Athletics Indoor Championships
60 m: 2021, 2022 (2)
Long jump: 2017 (1)

See also
 List of European records in athletics
 List of Italian records in athletics
 Italian all-time lists - 100 m
 Italian all-time lists -  relay
 Italian podiums in the Diamond League
 2020/21 in 60 metres (1st with 6.47)
 2018 in 100 metres (45th with 10.08)
 2019 in 100 metres (33rd with 10.03)
 2020 in 100 metres (22nd with 10.10)
 Italian national track relay team

References

External links

 

1994 births
Living people
Italian male long jumpers
Italian male sprinters
Citizens of Italy through descent
Athletes (track and field) at the 2020 Summer Olympics
Olympic athletes of Italy
Athletics competitors of Fiamme Oro
Italian people of African-American descent
American people of Italian descent
Sportspeople from El Paso, Texas
Sportspeople from Brescia
World Athletics Championships athletes for Italy
Italian Athletics Championships winners
European Athletics Indoor Championships winners
Medalists at the 2020 Summer Olympics
Olympic gold medalists for Italy
Olympic gold medalists in athletics (track and field)
Olympic male sprinters
World Athletics Indoor Championships winners
European Athletics Championships winners
21st-century Italian people